The 1992 Tooheys 1000 was the 33rd running of the Bathurst 1000 touring car race. It was held on 4 October 1992, at the Mount Panorama Circuit just outside Bathurst. The race was held for cars eligible for International Group A touring car regulations and a class available for those who had built cars eligible to the new for 1993 class, CAMS Group 3A touring car regulations.

The race was won for the second year in a row by Jim Richards and Mark Skaife driving a Gibson Motor Sport prepared Nissan Skyline GT-R, the pair becoming the first back to back Bathurst winners since Peter Brock and Larry Perkins had won in 1983 and 1984. Richards and Skaife had to be declared the winners after a rainstorm swept across the race in the closing stages causing many accidents in conditions deemed by race officials too dangerous to continue. The race results were issued as at the end of the 143rd lap, 18 laps short of full race distance. This was the second time in the event's history where the race was stopped and results declared before the scheduled laps were completed (previous occasion was in 1981).

The Dick Johnson Racing run Ford Sierra of Dick Johnson and John Bowe was classified in second position with Richards and Skaife's teammates Anders Olofsson and Neil Crompton in third. Former Formula One World Champion Denny Hulme suffered a heart attack at the wheel; he came to a halt at the side of the track and was pronounced dead shortly afterwards.

Class structure and entry list

Class structure
Class A
For Group A cars of over 1600cc engine capacity, it featured the turbocharged Ford Sierras, Nissan Skylines and Toyota Supras, V8 Holden Commodores, four cylinder BMW M3s and a BMW 635CSi.

Class B
For Group A cars of under 1600cc engine capacity, it was composed exclusively of various models of Toyota Corolla.

Class C
A class for the new V8 touring car class that would take over Australian touring car racing in 1993 that would later become known as V8 Supercar. It was composed of three Holden VP Commodores and a Ford EB Falcon.

Entry list
47 cars were entered in the race.

Race

Nine time Bathurst winner Peter Brock had his worst ever start to the race when the tailshaft of his new VP Commodore broke on the starting line. After sitting on the side of the circuit for a number of laps, the car was eventually towed into the pits where the Mobil 1 crew fitted a new tailshaft while Brock explained to the television audience that it was a brand new tail shaft fitted that morning that had broken. Brock, whose co-driver was German DTM driver and winner of the 1989 24 Hours of Le Mans, Manuel Reuter, rejoined the race on lap 15 in last position. After later breaking a second tailshaft and being pushed into a spin at Forrest's Elbow during the first rain storm by the Holden Racing Team Commodore of Allan Grice which forced Brock to pit when Grice pushed past and ground the front spoiler off of the Mobil 1 Commodore (causing Brock to vent on television about Grice's driving in a rare show of emotion), Brock and Reuter finished in 27th place.

This race was notable for the winning car being crashed and undrivable at the race's conclusion.  Due to heavy rain a large number of crashes occurred towards the end of the race leading to the race being stopped during the leader's 145th lap, requiring a windback to the completed 144th lap. However, many cars had crashed prior to the leader's completion of the 144th lap so the race was woundback an additional lap to allow them to be placed. Due to this windback, Richards' car which had hit the wall once suffering extensive damage—drivable but barely so—and had then slid off the track to join several other cars that had crashed about 200 metres past Forrest's Elbow onto Conrod Straight, was the winner since it was the lead car. Due to high concentrations of Ford and Holden fans and spectators generally upset that a crashed car had won race winner Jim Richards, who drove a Nissan, was vociferously booed as he took the podium. Distressed over the death his friend Denny Hulme which he was only informed about moments before he took to the podium (see below), as well as the crowd's reaction, in his very brief, international live feed broadcast victory speech he told the spectators, "You're a pack of arseholes." (see right for full comment) Richards later apologised for his comments.

The race was also the last in which turbo powered cars such as the Nissan Skyline and Ford Sierra would be permitted to compete. As of 1 January 1993 the turbos were banned in favor of the previously mentioned V8 formula which would later evolve into V8 Supercars.

1992 was also significant in that it saw the return of the Ford Falcon to Bathurst for the first time since the end of the Group C era in 1984. Glenn Seton and new team recruit Alan Jones qualified their 1993 V8 spec Ford EB Falcon in 4th place, the fastest of the 1993 cars (all 4 of which qualified in the Top 10). While the new Falcon V8 performed above even Seton's expectations, unfortunately their race ended on lap 84 with fuel pump failure. The other three 1993 spec cars were the Holden VP Commodore's from the Holden Racing Team and Peter Brock's example.

Australia's 1987 500cc Grand Prix World Champion Wayne Gardner made his touring car racing debut in the race partnering Sydney veteran Graham Moore in Moore's Holden VN Commodore SS Group A SV. Moore qualified the car in 21st position and they eventually finished in 26th place. Gardner's first ever race drive came while rain lashed the circuit. Gardner's presence in the race saw two former Grand Prix motorcycle racing World Champions driving in the race. Johnny Cecotto, who had won World Championships in 1975 and 1978, co-drove with Tony Longhurst in a BMW M3 Evolution. Cecotto almost didn't get to drive in the race after he crashed the car at Forrest's Elbow in the race morning warm up session, though the TAFE crash repair crew were able to repair the car for the start. Longhurst and Cecotto would finish in fourth place.

The 1992 Tooheys 1000 was also a sad occasion as popular veteran driver and  Formula One world champion Denny Hulme, 56 years old from New Zealand and that country's only World Drivers' Champion, died of a heart attack suffered during lap 33. Hulme, driving the second Benson & Hedges Racing BMW M3 with young driver Paul Morris, started the race in 18th position. On lap 33 when the race was under heavy rain, Hulme radioed into his team while coming through Forrest's Elbow that he could not see. Coming down Conrod Straight, the yellow #20 BMW went off the track and glanced the wall on the left hand side before continuing across the track to the outside wall where the car came to a stop, Channel 7 cameras capturing the incident. Most concern was with the driver. While the race continued under the safety car, Hulme was removed from the car and taken by ambulance to nearby Bathurst Hospital where he was later pronounced dead from heart failure. According to unconfirmed reports, Hulme was still alive, though unconscious, when track marshals reached the BMW a few seconds after it came to a stop just before the right hand kink into Caltex Chase.

Tooheys Top 10

* 1992 was the second and final time Dick Johnson claimed pole position at Bathurst. He had also been on pole in 1988. Johnson's time of 2:12.898 was almost one second faster than any other Sierra had ever been around the mountain and over 3 seconds faster than his shootout time from 1991. Johnson surprised many by driving in the shootout as it was Bowe who had set the cars fastest qualifying time. Longhurst admitted his lap was helped by getting a tow on the straights from Larry Perkins in his Holden Commodore. Without the benefit of the tow in the runoff, Longhurst dropped to 9th place* Larry Perkins, the winner of the recent 1992 Sandown 500, also surprised by qualifying his older model VL Commodore in 2nd place in both official qualifying and the runoff. While many questioned the legality of the older model Commodore to go so fast, Perkins pointed out that he was only 8/10ths faster than he was in the same model in 1990 while the Sierra's (Johnson) had improved considerably more.* Glenn Seton qualified his 1993 spec V8 Ford EB Falcon in 4th place, the fastest of the new cars. The two Holden Racing Team (HRT) cars, as well as Peter Brock's, were the new 1993 spec VP Commodores, all of which used a Chevrolet V8 engine. Larry Perkins' 1988 model Commodore used the Holden V8 engine. 1992 was also the first time that the HRT managed to get both team cars into the shootout.

Official results

Statistics
 Provisional Pole Position - #1 Mark Skaife - 2:13.82
 Pole Position – #17 Dick Johnson – 2:12.898
 Fastest Lap – #1 Mark Skaife – 2:16.47 - Lap 114
 Average Speed – 138 km/h
 Race Time - 6:27:16.22

See also
1992 Australian Touring Car season

References

External links
 Official V8 Supercar website
 Australian Titles Retrieved from www.camsmanual.com.au on 1 February 2009
 www.touringcarracing.net
 race results
 Images from the 1992 Tooheys 1000 Retrieved from www.autopics.com.au on 1 February 2009

Motorsport in Bathurst, New South Wales
Tooheys 1000